Lawrence Benjamin Bunker (November 4, 1928 – March 8, 2005) was an American jazz drummer, vibraphonist, and percussionist. A member of the Bill Evans Trio in the mid-1960s, he also played timpani with the Los Angeles Philharmonic orchestra.

Biography 
Born in Long Beach, California, Bunker was a central figure on the West Coast jazz scene, one of the relatively few who actually were from the region.  In the 1950s and 1960s he appeared at Howard Rumsey's Lighthouse in Hermosa Beach, and performed with Shorty Rogers and His Giants and others. At first he played primarily drums, but increasingly he focused on vibraphone and was later highly regarded for his playing of timpani and various percussion instruments.

A dependable and in-demand studio drummer and vibist, Bunker achieved particular distinction by recording with Billie Holiday, Ella Fitzgerald, Peggy Lee, Diana Krall, and many other jazz greats. In 1952, he was the drummer in one of Art Pepper's first groups. In 1953 and 1954, Bunker played drums in some of the earliest of Gerry Mulligan's groups. From 1963 to 1965, he was, intermittently, the drummer in the Bill Evans trio. His work in movie soundtracks spanned over fifty years, from Stalag 17 (1953) and Glengarry Glen Ross (1992) to The Incredibles (2004), and included soundtracks by John Williams, Henry Mancini, Quincy Jones, Miklós Rózsa, Jerry Goldsmith, Johnny Mandel, Lalo Schifrin and many other composers.

Bunker died of complications of a stroke in Los Angeles at age 76.

Discography 
As Leader
 Live at Shelly's Manne-Hole – as The Larry Bunker Quartette featuring Gary Burton (1966 [1990])
With Christina Aguilera
 My Kind of Christmas (RCA Records, 2000)
With Chet Baker
 West Coast Live – with Stan Getz (1953–54 [1997])
 Chet Baker Quartet featuring Russ Freeman (Pacific Jazz, 1953)
 Pretty/Groovy (World Pacific, 1953 [1958])
With Cheryl Bentyne
 Something Cool (Columbia, 1992)
With Michael Bolton
Timeless: The Classics (Columbia, 1992)
This Is The Time: The Christmas Album (Columbia, 1996)
With Tim Buckley
Sefronia (DiscReet Records, 1973)
With Gary Burton
 Something's Coming! (RCA, 1963)
 The Time Machine (RCA, 1966)
With Benny Carter
 Aspects (United Artists, 1959)
With Natalie Cole
 Unforgettable... with Love (Elektra Records, 1991)
 Take a Look (Elektra Records, 1993)
 Holly & Ivy (Elektra, 1994)
 Ask a Woman Who Knows (Verve, 2002)
With Buddy Collette
 Man of Many Parts (Contemporary, 1956)
With Bobby Darin
 Love Swings (Atco, 1961)
 Winners (Atco, 1964)
 Bobby Darin Sings The Shadow of Your Smile (Atlantic, 1966)
With Neil Diamond
 Tap Root Manuscript (Uni Records, 1970)
With The 5th Dimension
 Stoned Soul Picnic (Soul City, 1968)
 The Age of Aquarius (Soul City, 1969)
 Portrait (Bell, 1970)
 Love's Lines, Angles and Rhymes (Bell, 1971)
 Individually & Collectively (Bell, 1972)
 Living Together, Growing Together (Bell, 1973)
With Bill Evans
 Time Remembered (Milestone, 1963)
 At Shelly's Manne-Hole (Riverside, 1963)
 The Bill Evans Trio "Live" (Verve, 1964)
 Waltz for Debby (Philips, 1964)
Trio '65 (Verve, 1965)
Bill Evans Trio with Symphony Orchestra (Verve, 1965)
With Clare Fischer
Surging Ahead (Pacific Jazz, 1963)
Extension (Pacific Jazz, 1963)
Thesaurus (Atlantic, 1969)
With Michael Franks
Michael Franks (Brut, 1973)
The Art of Tea (Warner Bros. Records, 1976)
Sleeping Gypsy (Warner Bros. Records, 1977)
With Stan Getz
Children of the World (Columbia, 1979)
With Vince Gill
 Breath of Heaven: A Christmas Collection (MCA Records, 1998)
With Dizzy Gillespie
The New Continent (Limelight, 1962)
With Tramaine Hawkins
To a Higher Place (Columbia, 1994)
With Woody Herman
Songs for Hip Lovers (Verve, 1957)
With Richard "Groove" Holmes
 Six Million Dollar Man (RCA, 1975)
With Paul Horn
House of Horn (Dot, 1957)
Plenty of Horn (Dot, 1958)
Impressions of Cleopatra (Columbia, 1963)
Jazz Suite on the Mass Texts (RCA Victor, 1965) with Lalo Schifrin
With Al Jarreau
We Got By (Reprise Records, 1975)
With Plas Johnson
This Must Be the Plas (Capitol, 1959)
With Stan Kenton
Lush Interlude (Capitol, 1958)
A Merry Christmas! (Capitol, 1961)
Artistry in Bossa Nova (Capitol, 1963)
Artistry in Voices and Brass (Capitol, 1963)
Stan Kenton Plays for Today (Capitol, 1966)
With Diana Krall
When I Look in Your Eyes (Verve, 1999)
With Peggy Lee
Black Coffee (Decca, 1956)
Dream Street (Decca, 1957)
I Like Men! (Capitol, 1959)
Blues Cross Country (Capitol, 1962)
Mirrors (A&M, 1975)
With Lou Levy
Jazz in Four Colors (RCA, 1959)
With Johnny Mandel
I Want to Live (United Artists, 1958)
With Barry Manilow
Showstoppers (Arista, 1991)
Manilow Sings Sinatra (Arista, 1998)
With Shelly Manne
Daktari (Atlantic, 1967)
With Carmen McRae
It Takes a Whole Lot of Human Feeling (Groove Merchant, 1973)
Can't Hide Love (Blue Note, 1976)
With Gerry Mulligan
Gerry Mulligan Quartet Volume 1 (Pacific Jazz, 1952)
Lee Konitz Plays with the Gerry Mulligan Quartet (Pacific Jazz, 1953 [1957]) with Lee Konitz
Gene Norman Presents the Original Gerry Mulligan Tentet and Quartet (GNP, 1953 [1997])
California Concerts (Pacific Jazz, 1955)
With Mark Murphy
Mark Murphy's Hip Parade (Capitol, 1960)
With Walter Murphy
Walter Murphy's Discosymphony (New York, 1979)
With Oliver Nelson
Soulful Brass with Steve Allen (Impulse!, 1968)
With Robert Palmer
Ridin' High (EMI, 1992)
With Art Pepper
Surf Ride (Savoy, 1952–1954 [1956])
With Shorty Rogers
 Wherever the Five Winds Blow (RCA Victor, 1956 [1957])
Gigi in Jazz (RCA Victor, 1958)
The Wizard of Oz and Other Harold Arlen Songs (RCA Victor, 1959)
Jazz Waltz (Reprise, 1962)
With Kenny Rogers
Timepiece (143, 1994)
With Linda Ronstadt
Canciones de Mi Padre (Elektra Records, 1987)
With Pete Rugolo
Music for Hi-Fi Bugs (EmArcy, 1956)
An Adventure in Sound: Brass in Hi-Fi (Mercury, 1956 [1958])
Percussion at Work (EmArcy, 1957)
The Music from Richard Diamond (EmArcy, 1959)
Behind Brigitte Bardot (Warner Bros., 1960)
The Original Music of Thriller (Time, 1961)
Ten Trumpets and 2 Guitars (Mercury, 1961)
With Lalo Schifrin
More Mission: Impossible (Paramount, 1968)
Mannix (Paramount, 1968)
Bullitt (Warner Bros., 1968)
Che! (Tetragrammaton, 1969)
Kelly's Heroes (MGM, 1970)
Rock Requiem (Verve, 1971)
Enter the Dragon (Warner Bros., 1973)
With Diane Schuur
In Tribute (GRP, 1992)
With Bud Shank
Strings & Trombones (Pacific Jazz, 1955) with Bob Brookmeyer
I'll Take Romance (World Pacific, 1958)
Bossa Nova Jazz Samba (Pacific Jazz, 1962) with Clare Fischer
Brasamba! (Pacific Jazz, 1963) with Clare Fischer and Joe Pass
Bud Shank & the Sax Section (Pacific Jazz, 1966)
With Nina Simone
 A Single Woman (Elektra, 1993)
With B. W. Stevenson
 We Be Sailin (Warner Bros., 1975)With Donna SummerDonna Summer (Geffen, 1982)With Lew TabackinTenor Gladness (Disco Mate, 1976) with Warne MarshWith The Manhattan TransferThe Christmas Album (Columbia, 1992)With U2Rattle and Hum (Island, 1988)With Sarah Vaughan Sarah Vaughan with Michel Legrand (Mainstream Records, 1972)With Wendy Waldman'''Love Has Got Me'' (Warner Bros. Records, 1973)

Notes

References

External links 
Larry Bunker (Jazz and Studio Legend) – Tribute Website
Todd S. Jenkins, "The Last Post"

American jazz drummers
West Coast jazz drummers
American jazz vibraphonists
Jazz musicians from California
1928 births
2005 deaths
Musicians from Long Beach, California
20th-century American drummers
American male drummers
20th-century American male musicians
American male jazz musicians